Sergey Elefertovich Lebedev (born 31 January 1969 in the Uzbek SSR, Soviet Union) is a retired football midfielder. Lebedev is a former Uzbekistani international, who obtained a total number of 33 caps during his career, scoring ten goals. He later became a football coach.

Playing career
Lebedev started playing professionally in Turbina Naberezhnye Chelny in 1985. He completed 3 seasons for Turbina and wento to FC Dynamo Kirov in 1988. In 1989–91 he played for Neftyanik Fergana and 1990 he won Soviet Second League with club and promoted to Soviet First League.
In 1992–1999 he played for Neftchi Farg'ona and won 4 times Uzbekistani championship and two Uzbek Cups. He became Neftchi's best League goalscorer in 1996 and 1998 seasons. His last club played was also Neftchi Farg'ona. He joined club in 2006 after playing for Metallurg Bekabad in 2005.

International
Lebedev capped 33 matches, scoring 10 goals for national team. He was one of the player of Uzbekistan who won Asian Games in 1994. He scored two goals in Asian Games 1994. Lebedev scored his second goal in Final match against China on 8-minute as Uzbekistan after that began leading 2:0. He also participated in 2 AFC Asian Cups: 1996 AFC Asian Cup and 2000 AFC Asian Cup.

Managing career
After getting retired in 2006, he started his managing career at club level. He started to work as assistant coach to Yuriy Sarkisyan in Neftchi Farg'ona. He remained in club coaching stuff when Yuriy Sarkisyan was sacked in May 2013.

Honours

Club

Neftchi
 Soviet Second League, East conference (1): 1990
 Uzbek League (4): 1992, 1993, 1994, 1995
 Uzbek Cup (2): 1994, 1996
 Asian Club Championship 3rd: 1995
 CIS Cup runners-up: 1994

International
 Asian Games champion: 1994

Individual
 Neftchi League Top goalscorer (2): 1996 (13 goals), 1998 (18 goals)

External links

RSSSF Uzbekistan international footballers

1969 births
Living people
People from Fergana
Soviet footballers
Uzbekistani footballers
Uzbekistani people of Russian descent
Uzbekistani football managers
Uzbekistan international footballers
1996 AFC Asian Cup players
2000 AFC Asian Cup players
Association football midfielders
Uzbekistani expatriate footballers
Expatriate footballers in Russia
Uzbekistani expatriate sportspeople in Russia
FC Dynamo Kirov players
FC Shinnik Yaroslavl players
Russian Premier League players
FK Neftchi Farg'ona players
PFK Metallurg Bekabad players
FC Sogdiana Jizzakh players
FC Nasaf players
Footballers at the 1994 Asian Games
Footballers at the 1998 Asian Games
Asian Games gold medalists for Uzbekistan
Asian Games medalists in football
Medalists at the 1994 Asian Games